Ajay (also Romanized as Ājāy) is a village in Bastam Rural District, in the Central District of Chaypareh County, West Azerbaijan Province, Iran. At the 2006 census, its population was 83, in 20 families.

References 

Populated places in Chaypareh County